The Hälsingland Runic Inscription 21 is a Viking Age memorial runestone cataloged as Hs 21 under Rundata, located in Jättendal, Nordanstig Municipality, Hälsingland, Sweden. It is notable for being crafted by a female  runemaster.

Description
This runestone consists of runic text carved within a band that curves along the stone. The granite runestone, which is two meters in height, is classified as being carved in a runestone style known as RAK. The inscription states that the runemaster, Gunnborga, "painted" the runes. She is the only known female rune carver during this time period in Scandinavia. The runic text uses the word fahido, "painted", also translated as "carved" or "inscribed." Although many runestones had their inscriptions painted, there is no direct evidence that this particular runestone was painted.

Of the personal names in the inscription, Ásmundr means "Divine Hand" and Farthegn means either "Far-Travelling Thegn" or "Far-Traveling Warrior." The name Thorketill or Þorketil, which includes as a theophoric name element the Norse pagan god Thor, signifies a "Vessel of Thor" or "Kettle of Thor", possibly a type of sacrificial cauldron. The Poetic Edda poem Hymiskviða includes a story of Thor fetching a large cauldron to brew ale.

Inscription
A transliteration of the runic inscription into roman letters is:
asmuntr * ok fa[r]þ[i]k[l] * þiʀ ritu stin * þina * aftiʀ þu[rkatil * faþur sin * a utrunkum * k]unburka faþ[i stin þina in kuþa]

See also
List of runestones

References

External links
 Image of this runestone from The Swedish National Heritage Board

Hälsingland Runic Inscription 021